The 2014 Waterford Senior Hurling Championship was the 114th staging of the Waterford Senior Hurling Championship since its establishment by the Waterford County Board in 1887. The championship began on 25 April 2014 and ended on 5 October 2014.

Passage are the defending champions, however, they were defeated in the quarter-final stages. Ballygunner won the title following a 2–16 to 0–9 defeat of Mount Sion in the final, having remained undefeated during the whole championship campaign.	
Ardmore were relegated having lost all their group games and the relegation play-off.

Teams

Overview

All but one of the twelve teams from the 2013 championship are participated in the top tier of Waterford hurling in 2014.

Ardmore, who defeated Dunhill by 0–23 to 2–13 in the final of the intermediate championship in 2013, availed of their right to automatic promotion to the senior championship.

Similarly, Roanmore defeated An Rinn by 3–15 to 3–9 in the 2013 relegation play-off, and so An Rinn were relegated to the intermediate grade for 2014.

Fixtures and results

Group 1

Group 2

Relegation play-off

Quarter-finals

Semi-finals

Final

External links
 2014 Senior Hurling Championship Group 1 results
 2014 Senior Hurling Championship Group 2 results

References

Waterford Senior Hurling Championship
Waterford Senior Hurling Championship